A diacritic (also diacritical mark, diacritical point, diacritical sign, or accent) is a glyph added to a letter or to a basic glyph. The word diacritic is a noun, though it is sometimes used in an attributive sense, whereas diacritical is only an adjective. Some diacritics, such as the acute ( ◌́ ) and grave ( ◌̀ ), are often called accents. Diacritics may appear above or below a letter or in some other position such as within the letter or between two letters.

The main use of diacritics in Latin script is to change the sound-values of the letters to which they are added. Historically, English has used the diaeresis diacritic to indicate the correct pronunciation of ambiguous words, such as "coöperate", without which the <oo> letter sequence could be misinterpreted to be pronounced . Other examples are the acute and grave accents, which can indicate that a vowel is to be pronounced differently than is  normal in that position, for example not reduced to /ə/ or silent as in the case of the two uses of the letter e in the noun résumé (as opposed to the verb resume) and the help sometimes provided in the pronunciation of some words such as doggèd, learnèd, blessèd, and especially words pronounced differently than normal in poetry (for example movèd, breathèd).

All these diacritics, however, are frequently omitted in writing, and English is the only major modern European language that does not have diacritics in common usage.

In Latin-script alphabets in other languages, diacritics may distinguish between homonyms, such as the French  ("there") versus  ("the"), which are both pronounced . In Gaelic type, a dot over a consonant indicates lenition of the consonant in question.

In other alphabetic systems, diacritics may perform other functions. Vowel pointing systems, namely the Arabic harakat (  etc.) and the Hebrew niqqud (  etc.) systems, indicate vowels that are not conveyed by the basic alphabet. The Indic virama ( ् etc.) and the Arabic sukūn (  ) mark the absence of vowels. Cantillation marks indicate prosody. Other uses include the Early Cyrillic titlo stroke ( ◌҃ ) and the Hebrew gershayim (  ), which, respectively, mark abbreviations or acronyms, and Greek diacritical marks, which showed that letters of the alphabet were being used as numerals. In Vietnamese and the Hanyu Pinyin official romanization system for Chinese, diacritics are used to mark the tones of the syllables in which the marked vowels occur.

In orthography and collation, a letter modified by a diacritic may be treated either as a new, distinct letter or as a letter–diacritic combination. This varies from language to language and may vary from case to case within a language.

In some cases, letters are used as "in-line diacritics", with the same function as ancillary glyphs, in that they modify the sound of the letter preceding them, as in the case of the "h" in the English pronunciation of "sh" and "th". Such letter combinations are sometimes even collated as a single distinct letter. For example, the spelling sch was traditionally often treated as a separate letter in German. Words with that spelling were listed after all other words spelled with s in card catalogs in the Vienna public libraries, for example (before digitization).

Types

Among the types of diacritic used in alphabets based on the Latin script are:
 accents (so called because the acute, grave, and circumflex were originally used to indicate different types of pitch accents in the polytonic transcription of Greek)
 – acute
  – grave
  – circumflex
  – caron, wedge
  – double acute
  – double grave
  – tilde
 one dot
  – overdot used in many orthographies and transcriptions
  – an underdot is also used in many orthographies and transcriptions
  – interpunct is used as a diacritic in Canadian Aboriginal syllabics
 tittle, the superscript dot of the modern lowercase Latin i and j
two dots: 
 two overdots  are used for umlaut, diaeresis and others; 
 two underdots  are used in the International Phonetic Alphabet (IPA) and the ALA-LC romanization system
  – triangular colon, used in the IPA to mark long vowels (the "dots" are triangular, not circular).
 curves
 – breve
  – inverted breve
  – sicilicus, a palaeographic diacritic similar to a caron or breve
  – tilde
  – titlo
 vertical stroke
 macron or horizontal line
  – macron
  – underbar
 overlays
  – vertical bar through the character
  – slash through the character
  – crossbar through the character
 ring
  – overring
 superscript curls
 – apostrophe
  – inverted apostrophe
  – reversed apostrophe
  – hook above
  – horn
 subscript curls
  – undercomma
  – cedilla
  – hook, left or right, sometimes superscript
  – ogonek
 double marks (over or under two base characters)
  – double breve
  – tie bar or top ligature
  – double circumflex
  – longum
  – double tilde
 double sub/superscript diacritics
 – double cedilla
  – double ogonek
  – double diaeresis
 – double ypogegrammeni

The tilde, dot, comma, titlo, apostrophe, bar, and colon are sometimes diacritical marks, but also have other uses.

Not all diacritics occur adjacent to the letter they modify. In the Wali language of Ghana, for example, an apostrophe indicates a change of vowel quality, but occurs at the beginning of the word, as in the dialects ’Bulengee and ’Dolimi. Because of vowel harmony, all vowels in a word are affected, so the scope of the diacritic is the entire word. In abugida scripts, like those used to write Hindi and Thai, diacritics indicate vowels, and may occur above, below, before, after, or around the consonant letter they modify.

The tittle (dot) on the letter i or the letter j, of the Latin alphabet originated as a diacritic to clearly distinguish i from the minims (downstrokes) of adjacent letters. It first appeared in the 11th century in the sequence ii (as in ), then spread to i adjacent to m, n, u, and finally to all lowercase is. The j, originally a variant of i, inherited the tittle. The shape of the diacritic developed from initially resembling today's acute accent to a long flourish by the 15th century. With the advent of Roman type it was reduced to the round dot we have today.

Several languages of eastern Europe use diacritics on both consonants and vowels, whereas in western Europe digraphs are more often used to change consonant sounds. Most languages in Europe use diacritics on vowels, aside from English where there are typically none (with some exceptions).

Diacritics specific to non-Latin alphabets

Arabic

 (ئ ؤ إ أ and stand alone ء) : indicates a glottal stop.
 (ــًــٍــٌـ)  symbols: Serve a grammatical role in Arabic. The sign ـً is most commonly written in combination with alif, e.g. .
 (ــّـ) : Gemination (doubling) of consonants.
 (ٱ) : Comes most commonly at the beginning of a word. Indicates a type of  that is pronounced only when the letter is read at the beginning of the talk.
 (آ) : A written replacement for a  that is followed by an alif, i.e..
  (In Arabic:  also called  ):
 (ــَـ)  (a)
 (ــِـ)  (i)
 (ــُـ)  (u)
 (ــْـ)  (no vowel)
 The  or vowel points serve two purposes:
 They serve as a phonetic guide. They indicate the presence of short vowels (or ) or their absence.
 At the last letter of a word, the vowel point reflects the inflection case or conjugation mood.
 Vowel points or  should not be confused with consonant points or  – one, two or three dots written above or below a consonant to distinguish between letters of the same or similar form.

Greek

These diacritics are used in addition to the acute, grave, and circumflex accents and the diaeresis:
  – iota subscript 
  – rough breathing: aspiration
  – smooth (or soft) breathing: lack of aspiration

Hebrew

 Niqqud
  – Dagesh
  – Mappiq
  – Rafe
  – Shin dot (at top right corner)
  – Sin dot (at top left corner)
  – Shva
  – Kubutz
  – Holam
  – Kamatz
  – Patakh
  – Segol
  – Tzeire
  – Hiriq
 Cantillation marks do not generally render correctly; refer to Hebrew cantillation#Names and shapes of the ta'amim for a complete table together with instructions for how to maximize the possibility of viewing them in a web browser
 Other
  – Geresh
  – Gershayim

Korean

The diacritics  〮 and 〯 , known as Bangjeom, were used to mark pitch accents in Hangul for Middle Korean. They were written to the left of a syllable in vertical writing and above a syllable in horizontal writing.

Sanskrit and Indic

Syriac

 A dot above and a dot below a letter represent , transliterated as a or ă,
 Two diagonally-placed dots above a letter represent , transliterated as ā or â or å,
 Two horizontally-placed dots below a letter represent , transliterated as e or ĕ; often pronounced  and transliterated as i in the East Syriac dialect,
 Two diagonally-placed dots below a letter represent , transliterated as ē,
 A dot underneath the Beth represent a soft  sound, transliterated as v
 A tilde (~) placed under Gamel represent a  sound, transliterated as j
 The letter Waw with a dot below it represents , transliterated as ū or u,
 The letter Waw with a dot above it represents , transliterated as ō or o,
 The letter Yōḏ with a dot beneath it represents , transliterated as ī or i,
 A tilde (~) under Kaph represent a  sound, transliterated as ch or č,
 A semicircle under Peh represents an  sound, transliterated as f or ph.

In addition to the above vowel marks, transliteration of Syriac sometimes includes ə, e̊ or superscript e (or often nothing at all) to represent an original Aramaic schwa that became lost later on at some point in the development of Syriac. Some transliteration schemes find its inclusion necessary for showing spirantization or for historical reasons.

Non-alphabetic scripts
Some non-alphabetic scripts also employ symbols that function essentially as diacritics.
 Non-pure abjads (such as Hebrew and Arabic script) and abugidas use diacritics for denoting vowels. Hebrew and Arabic also indicate consonant doubling and change with diacritics; Hebrew and Devanagari use them for foreign sounds. Devanagari and related abugidas also use a diacritical mark called a virama to mark the absence of a vowel. In addition, Devanagari uses the moon-dot chandrabindu ( ँ ) for vowel nasalization.
 Unified Canadian Aboriginal Syllabics use several types of diacritics, including the diacritics with alphabetic properties known as Medials and Finals. Although long vowels originally were indicated with a negative line through the Syllabic glyphs, making the glyph appear broken, in the modern forms, a dot above is used to indicate vowel length. In some of the styles, a ring above indicates a long vowel with a [j] off-glide. Another diacritic, the "inner ring" is placed at the glyph's head to modify [p] to [f] and [t] to [θ]. Medials such as the "w-dot" placed next to the Syllabics glyph indicates a [w] being placed between the syllable onset consonant and the nucleus vowel. Finals indicate the syllable coda consonant; some of the syllable coda consonants in word medial positions, such as with the "h-tick", indicate the fortification of the consonant in the syllable following it.
 The Japanese hiragana and katakana syllabaries use the dakuten (◌゛) and handakuten (◌゜) (in Japanese: 濁点 and 半濁点) symbols, also known as nigori (濁 "muddying") or ten-ten (点々 "dot dot") and maru (丸 "circle"), to indicate voiced consonants or other phonetic changes.
 Emoticons are commonly created with diacritic symbols, especially Japanese emoticons on popular imageboards.

Alphabetization or collation

Different languages use different rules to put diacritic characters in alphabetical order. French and Portuguese treat letters with diacritical marks the same as the underlying letter for purposes of ordering and dictionaries.

The Scandinavian languages and the Finnish language, by contrast, treat the characters with diacritics å, ä, and ö as distinct letters of the alphabet, and sort them after z. Usually ä (a-umlaut) and ö (o-umlaut) [used in Swedish and Finnish] are sorted as equivalent to æ (ash) and ø (o-slash) [used in Danish and Norwegian]. Also, aa, when used as an alternative spelling to å, is sorted as such. Other letters modified by diacritics are treated as variants of the underlying letter, with the exception that ü is frequently sorted as y.

Languages that treat accented letters as variants of the underlying letter usually alphabetize words with such symbols immediately after similar unmarked words. For instance, in German where two words differ only by an umlaut, the word without it is sorted first in German dictionaries (e.g. schon and then schön, or fallen and then fällen). However, when names are concerned (e.g. in phone books or in author catalogues in libraries), umlauts are often treated as combinations of the vowel with a suffixed e; Austrian phone books now treat characters with umlauts as separate letters (immediately following the underlying vowel).

In Spanish, the grapheme ñ is considered a new letter different from n and collated between n and o, as it denotes a different sound from that of a plain n. But the accented vowels á, é, í, ó, ú are not separated from the unaccented vowels a, e, i, o, u, as the acute accent in Spanish only modifies stress within the word or denotes a distinction between homonyms, and does not modify the sound of a letter.

For a comprehensive list of the collating orders in various languages, see Collating sequence.

Generation with computers

Modern computer technology was developed mostly in English-speaking countries, so data formats, keyboard layouts, etc. were developed with a bias favoring English, a language with an alphabet without diacritical marks. Efforts have been made to create internationalized domain names that further extend the English alphabet (e.g., "pokémon.com").

Depending on the keyboard layout, which differs amongst countries, it is more or less easy to enter letters with diacritics on computers and typewriters. Some have their own keys; some are created by first pressing the key with the diacritic mark followed by the letter to place it on. Such a key is sometimes referred to as a dead key, as it produces no output of its own but modifies the output of the key pressed after it.

In modern Microsoft Windows and Linux operating systems, the keyboard layouts US International and UK International feature dead keys that allow one to type Latin letters with the acute, grave, circumflex, diaeresis/umlaut, tilde, and cedilla found in Western European languages (specifically, those combinations found in the ISO Latin-1 character set) directly:  +  gives ë,  +  gives õ, etc. On Apple Macintosh computers, there are keyboard shortcuts for the most common diacritics;  followed by a vowel places an acute accent,  followed by a vowel gives an umlaut,  gives a cedilla, etc. Diacritics can be composed in most X Window System keyboard layouts, as well as other operating systems, such as Microsoft Windows, using additional software.

On computers, the availability of code pages determines whether one can use certain diacritics. Unicode solves this problem by assigning every known character its own code; if this code is known, most modern computer systems provide a method to input it. With Unicode, it is also possible to combine diacritical marks with most characters. However, as of 2019, very few fonts include the necessary support to correctly render character-plus-diacritic(s) for the Latin, Cyrillic and some other alphabets (exceptions include Andika).

Languages with letters containing diacritics
The following languages have letters that contain diacritics that are considered independent letters distinct from those without diacritics.

Latin/Roman letters 
Baltic
 Latvian has the following letters: ā, ē, ī, ū, č, ģ, ķ, ļ, ņ, š, ž
 Lithuanian. In general usage, where letters appear with the caron (č, š and ž), they are considered as separate letters from c, s or z and collated separately; letters with the ogonek (ą, ę, į and ų), the macron (ū) and the superdot (ė) are considered as separate letters as well, but not given a unique collation order.
Celtic
 Welsh uses the circumflex, diaeresis, acute, and grave accents on its seven vowels a, e, i, o, u, w, y (hence the composites â, ê, î, ô, û, ŵ, ŷ, ä, ë, ï, ö, ü, ẅ, ÿ, á, é, í, ó, ú, ẃ, ý, à, è, ì, ò, ù, ẁ, ỳ).
 Following spelling reforms since the 1970s, Scottish Gaelic uses graves only, which can be used on any vowel (à, è, ì, ò, ù). Formerly acute accents could be used on á, ó and é, which were used to indicate a specific vowel quality. With the elimination of these accents, the new orthography relies on the reader having prior knowledge of pronunciation of a given word.
 Manx uses the single diacritic ç combined with h to give the digraph  (pronounced ) to mark the distinction between it and the digraph  (pronounced  or ). Other diacritics used in Manx included â, ê, ï, etc. to mark the distinction between two similarly spelled words but with slightly differing pronunciation.
 Irish uses only acute accents to mark long vowels, following the 1948 spelling reform. Lenition is indicated using an overdot in Gaelic type: in Roman type, a suffixed  is used.
 Breton does not have a single orthography (spelling system), but uses diacritics for a number of purposes. The diaeresis is used to mark that two vowels are pronounced separately and not as a diphthong/digraph. The circumflex is used to mark long vowels, but usually only when the vowel length is not predictable by phonology. Nasalization of vowels may be marked with a tilde, or following the vowel with the letter <ñ>. An apostrophe is used to distinguish c'h, pronounced  as the digraph <ch> is used in other Celtic languages, from the French-influenced digraph ch, pronounced .

Finno-Ugric
 Estonian has a distinct letter õ, which contains a tilde. Estonian "dotted vowels" ä, ö, ü are similar to German, but these are also distinct letters, not like German umlauted letters. All four have their own place in the alphabet, between w and x. Carons in š or ž appear only in foreign proper names and loanwords. Also these are distinct letters, placed in the alphabet between s and t.
 Finnish uses dotted (umlauted) vowels (ä and ö). As in Swedish and Estonian, these are regarded as individual letters, rather than vowel + umlaut combinations (as happens in German). It also uses the characters å, š and ž in foreign names and loanwords. In the Finnish and Swedish alphabets, å, ä and ö collate as separate letters after z, the others as variants of their base letter.
 Hungarian uses the umlaut, the acute and double acute accent (unique to Hungarian): (ö, ü), (á, é, í, ó, ú) and (ő, ű). The acute accent indicates the long form of a vowel (in case of i/í, o/ó, u/ú) while the double acute performs the same function for ö and ü. The acute accent can also indicate a different sound (more open, like in case of a/á, e/é). Both long and short forms of the vowels are listed separately in the Hungarian alphabet, but members of the pairs a/á, e/é, i/í, o/ó, ö/ő, u/ú and ü/ű are collated in dictionaries as the same letter.
 Livonian has the following letters: ā, ä, ǟ, ḑ, ē, ī, ļ, ņ, ō, ȯ, ȱ, õ, ȭ, ŗ, š, ț, ū, ž.

Germanic
 Faroese uses acutes and other special letters. All are considered separate letters and have their own place in the alphabet: á, í, ó, ú, ý and ø.
 Icelandic uses acutes and other special letters. All are considered separate letters, and have their own place in the alphabet: á, é, í, ó, ú, ý, and ö.
 Danish and Norwegian use additional characters like the o-slash ø and the a-overring å. These letters come after z and æ in the order ø, å. Historically, the å has developed from a ligature by writing a small superscript a over a lowercase a; if an å character is unavailable, some Scandinavian languages allow the substitution of a doubled a. The Scandinavian languages collate these letters after z, but have different collation standards.
 Swedish uses a-diaeresis (ä) and o-diaeresis (ö) in the place of ash (æ) and slashed o (ø) in addition to the a-overring (å). Historically, the diaeresis for the Swedish letters ä and ö, like the German umlaut, developed from a small Gothic e written above the letters. These letters are collated after z, in the order å, ä, ö.

Romance
 In Asturian, Galician and Spanish, the character ñ is a letter and collated between n and o.
 Asturian uses Ḷ (lower case ḷ), and Ḥ (lower case ḥ)
 French  uses four diacritics appearing on vowels (circumflex, acute, grave, diaeresis) and the cedilla appearing in "ç".
 Italian  uses two diacritics appearing on vowels (acute, grave)
 Leonese: could use ñ or nn.
 Romanian uses a breve on the letter a (ă) to indicate the sound schwa , as well as a circumflex over the letters a (â) and i (î) for the sound . These characters are collated after their non-diacritic equivalent.

Slavic
 The Bosnian, Croatian, and Serbian Latin alphabets have the symbols č, ć, đ, š and ž, which are considered separate letters and are listed as such in dictionaries and other contexts in which words are listed according to alphabetical order. They also have one digraph including a diacritic, dž, which is also alphabetized independently, and follows d and precedes đ in the alphabetical order. The Serbian Cyrillic alphabet has no diacritics, instead it has a grapheme (glyph) for every letter of its Latin counterpart (including Latin letters with diacritics and the digraphs dž, lj and nj).
 The Czech alphabet uses the acute (á é í ó ú ý), caron (č ď ě ň ř š ť ž), and for one letter (ů) the ring. (Note that in ď and ť the caron is modified to look rather like an apostrophe.)
 Polish has the following letters: ą ć ę ł ń ó ś ź ż. These are considered to be separate letters: each of them is placed in the alphabet immediately after its Latin counterpart (e.g. ą between a and b), ź and ż are placed after z in that order.
 The Slovak alphabet uses the acute (á é í ó ú ý ĺ ŕ), caron (č ď ľ ň š ť ž dž), umlaut (ä) and circumflex accent (ô). All of those are considered separate letters and are placed directly after the original counterpart in the alphabet.
 The basic Slovenian alphabet has the symbols č, š, and ž, which are considered separate letters and are listed as such in dictionaries and other contexts in which words are listed according to alphabetical order. Letters with a caron are placed right after the letters as written without the diacritic. The letter đ may be used in non-transliterated foreign words, particularly names, and is placed after č and before d.

Turkic
Azerbaijani includes the distinct Turkish alphabet letters Ç, Ğ, I, İ, Ö, Ş and Ü.
 Crimean Tatar includes the distinct Turkish alphabet letters Ç, Ğ, I, İ, Ö, Ş and Ü. Unlike Turkish, Crimean Tatar also has the letter Ñ.
 Gagauz includes the distinct Turkish alphabet letters Ç, Ğ, I, İ, Ö and Ü. Unlike Turkish, Gagauz also has the letters Ä, Ê Ș and Ț. Ș and Ț are derived from the Romanian alphabet for the same sounds. Sometime the Turkish Ş may be used instead of Ș.
 Turkish uses a G with a breve (Ğ), two letters with an umlaut (Ö and Ü, representing two rounded front vowels), two letters with a cedilla (Ç and Ş, representing the affricate  and the fricative ), and also possesses a dotted capital İ (and a dotless lowercase ı representing a high unrounded back vowel). In Turkish each of these are separate letters, rather than versions of other letters, where dotted capital İ and lower case i are the same letter, as are dotless capital I and lowercase ı. Typographically, Ç and Ş are sometimes rendered with a subdot, as in Ṣ; when a hook is used, it tends to have more a comma shape than the usual cedilla. The new Azerbaijani, Crimean Tatar, and Gagauz alphabets are based on the Turkish alphabet and its same diacriticized letters, with some additions.
 Turkmen includes the distinct Turkish alphabet letters Ç, Ö, Ş and Ü. In addition, Turkmen uses A with diaeresis (Ä) to represent , N with caron (Ň) to represent the velar nasal , Y with acute (Ý) to represent the palatal approximant , and Z with caron (Ž) to represent .

Other
Albanian has two special letters Ç and Ë upper and lowercase. They are placed next to the most similar letters in the alphabet, c and e correspondingly.
 Esperanto has the symbols ŭ, ĉ, ĝ, ĥ, ĵ and ŝ, which are included in the alphabet, and considered separate letters.
 Filipino also has the character ñ as a letter and is collated between n and o.
 Hawaiian uses the kahakō (macron) over vowels, although there is some disagreement over considering them as individual letters. The kahakō over a vowel can completely change the meaning of a word that is spelled the same but without the kahakō.
Kurdish uses the symbols Ç, Ê, Î, Ş and Û with other 26 standard Latin alphabet symbols.
Lakota alphabet uses the caron for the letters č, ȟ, ǧ, š, and ž. It also uses the acute accent for stressed vowels á, é, í, ó, ú, áŋ, íŋ, úŋ.
Malay uses some diacritics such as á, ā, ç, í, ñ, ó, š, ú. Uses of diacritics was continued until late 19th century except ā and ē.
Maltese uses a C, G, and Z with a dot over them (Ċ, Ġ, Ż), and also has an H with an extra horizontal bar. For uppercase H, the extra bar is written slightly above the usual bar. For lowercase H, the extra bar is written crossing the vertical, like a t, and not touching the lower part (Ħ, ħ). The above characters are considered separate letters. The letter 'c' without a dot has fallen out of use due to redundancy. 'Ċ' is pronounced like the English 'ch' and 'k' is used as a hard c as in 'cat'. 'Ż' is pronounced just like the English 'Z' as in 'Zebra', while 'Z' is used to make the sound of 'ts' in English (like 'tsunami' or 'maths'). 'Ġ' is used as a soft 'G' like in 'geometry', while the 'G' sounds like a hard 'G' like in 'log'. The digraph 'għ' (called għajn after the Arabic letter name ʻayn for غ) is considered separate, and sometimes ordered after 'g', whilst in other volumes it is placed between 'n' and 'o' (the Latin letter 'o' originally evolved from the shape of Phoenician ʻayin, which was traditionally collated after Phoenician nūn).
 The romanization of Syriac uses the altered letters of. Ā, Č, Ḏ, Ē, Ë, Ġ, Ḥ, Ō, Š, Ṣ, Ṭ, Ū, Ž alongside the 26 standard Latin alphabet symbols.
Vietnamese uses the horn diacritic for the letters ơ and ư; the circumflex for the letters â, ê, and ô; the breve for the letter ă; and a bar through the letter đ. Separately, it also has á, à, ả, ã and ạ, the five tones used for vowels besides the flat tone 'a'.

Cyrillic letters
Belarusian and Uzbek Cyrillic have a letter ў.
 Belarusian, Bulgarian, Russian and Ukrainian have the letter й.
 Belarusian and Russian have the letter ё. In Russian, this letter is usually replaced by е, although it has a different pronunciation. The use of е instead of ё does not affect the pronunciation. Ё is always used in children's books and in dictionaries. A minimal pair is все (vs'e, "everybody" pl.) and всё (vs'o, "everything" n. sg.). In Belarusian the replacement by е is a mistake; in Russian, it is permissible to use either е or ё for ё but the former is more common in everyday writing (as opposed to instructional or juvenile writing).
 The Cyrillic Ukrainian alphabet has the letters ґ, й and ї. Ukrainian Latynka has many more.
 Macedonian has the letters ќ and ѓ.
 In Bulgarian and Macedonian the possessive pronoun ѝ (ì, "her") is spelled with a grave accent in order to distinguish it from the conjunction и (i, "and").

Diacritics that do not produce new letters

English

English is one of the few European languages that does not have many words that contain diacritical marks. Instead, digraphs are the main way the Modern English alphabet adapts the Latin to its phonemes. Exceptions are unassimilated foreign loanwords, including borrowings from French (and, increasingly, Spanish, like jalapeño and piñata); however, the diacritic is also sometimes omitted from such words. Loanwords that frequently appear with the diacritic in English include café, résumé or resumé (a usage that helps distinguish it from the verb resume), soufflé, and naïveté (see English terms with diacritical marks). In older practice (and even among some orthographically-conservative modern writers), one may see examples such as élite, mêlée and rôle.

English speakers and writers once used the diaeresis more often than now in words such as coöperation (from Fr. coopération), zoölogy (from Grk. zoologia), and seeër (now more commonly see-er or simply seer) as a way of indicating that adjacent vowels belonged to separate syllables, but this practice has become far less common. The New Yorker magazine is a major publication that continues to use the diaeresis in place of a hyphen for clarity and economy of space.

A few English words, out of context, can only be distinguished from others by a diacritic or modified letter, including exposé, lamé, maté, öre, øre, pâté, and rosé. The same is true of résumé, alternatively  but, nevertheless, it is regularly spelled resume. In a few words, diacritics that did not exist in the original have been added for disambiguation, as in maté (from Sp. and Port. mate), saké (the standard Romanization of the Japanese has no accent mark), and Malé (from Dhivehi މާލެ), to clearly distinguish them from the English words mate, sake, and male.

The acute and grave accents are occasionally used in poetry and lyrics: the acute to indicate stress overtly where it might be ambiguous (rébel vs. rebél) or nonstandard for metrical reasons (caléndar), the grave to indicate that an ordinarily silent or elided syllable is pronounced (warnèd, parlìament).

In certain personal names such as Renée and Zoë, often two spellings exist, and the preference will be known only to those close to the person themselves. Even when the name of a person is spelled with a diacritic, like Charlotte Brontë, this may be dropped in English-language articles, and even in official documents such as passports, due either to carelessness, the typist not knowing how to enter letters with diacritical marks, or technical reasons (California, for example, does not allow names with diacritics, as the computer system cannot process such characters). They also appear in some worldwide company names and/or trademarks, such as Nestlé or Citroën.

Other languages
The following languages have letter-diacritic combinations that are not considered independent letters.
 Afrikaans uses a diaeresis to mark vowels that are pronounced separately and not as one would expect where they occur together, for example voel (to feel) as opposed to voël (bird). The circumflex is used in ê, î, ô and û generally to indicate long close-mid, as opposed to open-mid vowels, for example in the words wêreld (world) and môre (morning, tomorrow). The acute accent is used to add emphasis in the same way as underlining or writing in bold or italics in English, for example Dit is jóú boek (It is your book). The grave accent is used to distinguish between words that are different only in placement of the stress, for example appel (apple) and appèl (appeal) and in a few cases where it makes no difference to the pronunciation but distinguishes between homophones. The two most usual cases of the latter are in the sayings òf... òf (either... or) and nòg... nòg (neither... nor) to distinguish them from of (or) and nog (again, still).
 Aymara uses a diacritical horn over p, q, t, k, ch.
 Catalan has the following composite characters: à, ç, é, è, í, ï, ó, ò, ú, ü, l·l. The acute and the grave indicate stress and vowel height, the cedilla marks the result of a historical palatalization, the diaeresis indicates either a hiatus, or that the letter u is pronounced when the graphemes gü, qü are followed by e or i, the interpunct (·) distinguishes the different values of ll/l·l.
 Some orthographies of Cornish such as Kernowek Standard and Unified Cornish use diacritics, while others such as Kernewek Kemmyn and the Standard Written Form do not (or only use them optionally in teaching materials).
 Dutch uses the diaeresis. For example, in ruïne it means that the u and the i are separately pronounced in their usual way, and not in the way that the combination ui is normally pronounced. Thus it works as a separation sign and not as an indication for an alternative version of the i. Diacritics can be used for emphasis (érg koud for very cold) or for disambiguation between a number of words that are spelled the same when context doesn't indicate the correct meaning (één appel = one apple, een appel = an apple; vóórkomen = to occur, voorkómen = to prevent). Grave and acute accents are used on a very small number of words, mostly loanwords. The ç also appears in some loanwords.
 Faroese. Non-Faroese accented letters are not added to the Faroese alphabet. These include é, ö, ü, å and recently also letters like š, ł, and ć.
 Filipino has the following composite characters: á, à, â, é, è, ê, í, ì, î, ó, ò, ô, ú, ù, û. The actual use of diacritics for Filipino is, however, uncommon, and is meant only to distinguish between homonyms with different stresses and meanings that either occur near each other in a text or to aid the reader in ascertaining its otherwise ambiguous meaning. The letter eñe is due to the Spanish alphabet and too, is considered a separate letter. The diacritics appears in Spanish loanwords and names if Spanish orthography is observed.
 Finnish. Carons in š and ž appear only in foreign proper names and loanwords, but may be substituted with sh or zh if and only if it is technically impossible to produce accented letters in the medium. Contrary to Estonian, š and ž are not considered distinct letters in Finnish.
 French uses five diacritics. The grave (accent grave) marks the sound  when over an e, as in père ("father") or is used to distinguish words that are otherwise homographs such as a/à ("has"/"to") or ou/où ("or"/"where"). The acute (accent aigu) is only used in "é", modifying the "e" to make the sound , as in étoile ("star"). The circumflex (accent circonflexe) generally denotes that an S once followed the vowel in Old French or Latin, as in fête ("party"), the Old French being feste and the Latin being festum. Whether the circumflex modifies the vowel's pronunciation depends on the dialect and the vowel. The cedilla (cédille) indicates that a normally hard "c" (before the vowels "a", "o", and "u") is to be pronounced , as in ça ("that"). The diaeresis diacritic indicates that two adjacent vowels that would normally be pronounced as one are to be pronounced separately, as in Noël ("Christmas").
 Galician vowels can bear an acute (á, é, í, ó, ú) to indicate stress or difference between two otherwise same written words (é, 'is' vs. e, 'and'), but the diaeresis is only used with ï and ü to show two separate vowel sounds in pronunciation. Only in foreign words may Galician use other diacritics such as ç (common during the Middle Ages), ê, or à.
 German uses the three umlauted characters ä, ö and ü. These diacritics indicate vowel changes. For instance, the word Ofen  "oven" has the plural Öfen . The mark originated as a superscript e; a handwritten blackletter e resembles two parallel vertical lines, like a diaeresis. Due to this history, "ä", "ö" and "ü" can be written as "ae", "oe" and "ue" respectively, if the umlaut letters are not available.
 Hebrew has many various diacritic marks known as niqqud that are used above and below script to represent vowels. These must be distinguished from cantillation, which are keys to pronunciation and syntax.
 The International Phonetic Alphabet uses diacritic symbols and characters to indicate phonetic features or secondary articulations.
 Irish uses the acute to indicate that a vowel is long: á, é, í, ó, ú. It is known as síneadh fada "long sign" or simply fada "long" in Irish. In the older Gaelic type, overdots are used to indicate lenition of a consonant: ḃ, ċ, ḋ, ḟ, ġ, ṁ, ṗ, ṡ, ṫ.
 Italian mainly has the acute and the grave (à, è/é, ì, ò/ó, ù), typically to indicate a stressed syllable that would not be stressed under the normal rules of pronunciation but sometimes also to distinguish between words that are otherwise spelled the same way (e.g. "e", and; "è", is). Despite its rare use, Italian orthography allows the circumflex (î) too, in two cases: it can be found in old literary context (roughly up to 19th century) to signal a syncope (fêro→fecero, they did), or in modern Italian to signal the contraction of ″-ii″ due to the plural ending -i whereas the root ends with another -i; e.g., s. demonio, p. demonii→demonî; in this case the circumflex also signals that the word intended is not demoni, plural of "demone" by shifting the accent (demònî, "devils"; dèmoni, "demons").
 Lithuanian uses the acute, grave and tilde in dictionaries to indicate stress types in the language's pitch accent system.
 Maltese also uses the grave on its vowels to indicate stress at the end of a word with two syllables or more:– lowercase letters: à, è, ì, ò, ù ; capital letters: À, È, Ì, Ò, Ù
 Māori makes use of macrons to mark long vowels.
 Occitan has the following composite characters: á, à, ç, é, è, í, ï, ó, ò, ú, ü, n·h, s·h. The acute and the grave indicate stress and vowel height, the cedilla marks the result of a historical palatalization, the diaeresis indicates either a hiatus, or that the letter u is pronounced when the graphemes gü, qü are followed by e or i, and the interpunct (·) distinguishes the different values of nh/n·h and sh/s·h (i.e., that the letters are supposed to be pronounced separately, not combined into "ny" and "sh").
 Portuguese has the following composite characters: à, á, â, ã, ç, é, ê, í, ó, ô, õ, ú. The acute and the circumflex indicate stress and vowel height, the grave indicates crasis, the tilde represents nasalization, and the cedilla marks the result of a historical lenition.
 Acutes are also used in Slavic language dictionaries and textbooks to indicate lexical stress, placed over the vowel of the stressed syllable. This can also serve to disambiguate meaning (e.g., in Russian писа́ть (pisáť) means "to write", but пи́сать (písať) means "to piss"), or "бо́льшая часть" (the biggest part) vs "больша́я часть" (the big part).
 Spanish uses the acute and the diaeresis. The acute is used on a vowel in a stressed syllable in words with irregular stress patterns. Moreover, the acute can be used to distinguish words that otherwise are spelled alike, such as si ("if") and sí ("yes"), and also to distinguish interrogative and exclamatory pronouns from homophones with a different grammatical function, such as donde/¿dónde? ("where"/"where?") or como/¿cómo? ("as"/"how?"). The acute may also be used to avoid typographical ambiguity, as in 1 ó 2 ("1 or 2"; without the acute this might be interpreted as "1 0 2". The diaeresis is used only over u (ü) for it to be pronounced  in the combinations gue and gui, where u is normally silent, for example ambigüedad. In poetry, the diaeresis may be used on i and u as a way to force a hiatus. As foreshadowed above, in nasal ñ the tilde (squiggle) is not considered a diacritic sign at all, but a composite part of a distinct glyph, with its own chapter in the dictionary: a glyph that denotes the 15th letter of the Spanish alphabet.
This occasionally helps resolve ambiguities, such as ide (hibernation) versus idé (idea). In these words, the acute is not optional. Some proper names use non-standard diacritics, such as Carolina Klüft and Staël von Holstein. For foreign loanwords the original accents are strongly recommended, unless the word has been infused into the language, in which case they are optional. Hence crème fraîche but ampere. Swedish also has the letters å, ä, and ö, but these are considered distinct letters, not a and o with diacritics.
 Tamil does not have any diacritics in itself, but uses the Arabic numerals 2, 3 and 4 as diacritics to represent aspirated, voiced, and voiced-aspirated consonants when Tamil script is used to write long passages in Sanskrit.
 Thai has its own system of diacritics derived from Indian numerals, which denote different tones.
 Vietnamese uses the acute (dấu sắc), the grave (dấu huyền), the tilde (dấu ngã), the underdot (dấu nặng) and the hook above (dấu hỏi) on vowels as tone indicators.
 Welsh uses the circumflex, diaeresis, acute, and grave on its seven vowels a, e, i, o, u, w, y. The most common is the circumflex (which it calls to bach, meaning "little roof", or acen grom "crooked accent", or hirnod "long sign") to denote a long vowel, usually to disambiguate it from a similar word with a short vowel. The rarer grave accent has the opposite effect, shortening vowel sounds that would usually be pronounced long. The acute accent and diaeresis are also occasionally used, to denote stress and vowel separation respectively. The w-circumflex and the y-circumflex are among the most commonly accented characters in Welsh, but unusual in languages generally, and were until recently very hard to obtain in word-processed and HTML documents.

Transliteration
Several languages that are not written with the Roman alphabet are transliterated, or romanized, using diacritics. Examples:
 Arabic has several romanisations, depending on the type of the application, region, intended audience, country, etc. many of them extensively use diacritics, e.g., some methods use an underdot for rendering emphatic consonants (ṣ, ṭ, ḍ, ẓ, ḥ).
 Chinese has several romanizations that use the umlaut, but only on u (ü). In Hanyu Pinyin, the four tones of Mandarin Chinese are denoted by the macron (first tone), acute (second tone), caron (third tone) and grave (fourth tone) diacritics. Example: ā, á, ǎ, à.
 Romanized Japanese (Rōmaji) occasionally uses macrons to mark long vowels. The Hepburn romanization system uses macrons to mark long vowels, and the Kunrei-shiki and Nihon-shiki systems use a circumflex.
 Sanskrit, as well as many of its descendants, like Hindi and Bengali, uses a lossless romanization system, IAST. This includes several letters with diacritical markings, such as the macron (ā, ī, ū), over- and underdots (ṛ, ḥ, ṃ, ṇ, ṣ, ṭ, ḍ) as well as a few others (ś, ñ).

Limits

Orthographic

It is consists of:
 
 
 
 
 
 
 
 
 

An example of rendering, may be broken depending on browser:

Unorthographic/ornamental

Some users have explored the limits of rendering in web browsers and other software by "decorating" words with multiple nonsensical diacritics per character. The result is called "Zalgo text". The composed bogus characters and words can be copied and pasted normally via the system clipboard.

An example of rendering:

List of diacritics in Unicode 
Diacritics for Latin script in Unicode:

See also
 Latin-script alphabets
 Alt code
 :Category:Letters with diacritics
 Collating sequence
 Combining character
 Compose key
 English terms with diacritical marks
 Heavy metal umlaut
 ISO/IEC 8859 8-bit extended-Latin-alphabet European character encodings
 Latin alphabet
 List of Latin letters
 List of precomposed Latin characters in Unicode
 List of U.S. cities with diacritics
 Romanization
 wikt:Appendix:English words with diacritics

Notes

References

External links
 Context of Diacritics | A research project 
 Diacritics Project
 Unicode
 Orthographic diacritics and multilingual computing, by J. C. Wells
 Notes on the use of the diacritics, by Markus Lång
 Entering International Characters (in Linux, KDE)
 Standard Character Set for Macintosh PDF at Adobe.com

Punctuation
Typography